Kalverdijk (West Frisian: Kalveredìk) is a hamlet in the Dutch province of North Holland. It is a part of the municipality of Schagen, and lies about 8 km north of Heerhugowaard.

The hamlet was first mentioned in 1575 as Caluerdyck, and is a combination of dike and calf. Kalverdijk has place name signs. It is considered part of Tuitjenhorn, and consists of about 105 houses and 70 holiday homes.

References

Schagen
Populated places in North Holland